Gray Drug was an American drugstore chain in Cleveland, Ohio. The chain began in 1912 and grew to 46 stores by 1946 and over 100 by the 1970s. Besides Ohio, stores later opened in Florida and Maryland. The chain later acquired Alexandria, Virginia-based Drug Fair in 1981, shortly before Sherwin-Williams bought the chain. Gray Drug acquired several Cunningham Drug stores in 1982.

The company entered the discount department store business by acquiring the Cincinnati-based Rink's Department Store chain in 1964 and the Cleveland-based Bargain City chain in 1967.

Gray Drug was sold to Rite Aid in 1987.

References 

Rite Aid
Retail companies established in 1912
Companies based in Cleveland
Retail companies disestablished in 1987
Defunct pharmacies of the United States
Defunct companies based in Ohio
1912 establishments in Ohio
Health care companies based in Ohio